The National Security Bureau (NSB) is a state security intelligence-gathering agency of Yemen, responsible for the protection of the country from acts of foreign interference. The NSB reports directly to the office of the President of Yemen.

History 
NSB was established in 2002 by President Ali Abdullah Saleh. It was headquartered in Sana'a. The NSA director is appointed by President of Yemen. It was led by Ali Mohammed al-Ansi since its establishment until 2012. His deputy was Ammar Mohammed Saleh, nephew of former Yemeni president Ali Abduallah Saleh, until 2012. Both were close to President Saleh. Following an assassination attempt that targeted the defence minister in Sana'a with a car bomb, President Abdurabbuh Mansur Hadi sacked both and appointed Ali al-Ahmadi as chief of the NSA on 1 September 2012.

Mission 
Its main responsibilities include:

 Monitoring, collecting, analyzing, and processing information and data related to Yemen, as well as intelligence of foreign hostile attitudes and activities that pose a threat to the country's national security, sovereignty, political system, economy and military
 Receiving and analyzing reports and intelligence information from various sources
 Counter intelligence
 Detecting and combating subversive activities that threaten national security

Directors

References 

2002 establishments in Yemen
Law enforcement in Yemen
Intelligence Burea (Yemen)
Intelligence agencies
Government agencies of Yemen